Shinyribs is an American southern soul, swamp-funk band from Austin, Texas.

History 
Shinyribs began in 2007 as a solo side project of singer/guitar player Kevin Russell, then of longtime Austin band The Gourds.  At first "Shinyribs" referred to Russell personally in connection with his solo shows, but Russell later performed under the name "Shinyribs" in a band with other musicians, such as Gourds bandmate, drummer Keith Langford. "Shinyribs" then transitioned to be the name of the band as well.  The name derives from something called out to Russell by a transient woman to whom he had previously given a plate of ribs.

After the Gourds went on hiatus in 2013, Shinyribs became Russell's and Langford's primary vehicle. By 2016, Shinyribs included bass guitar, keyboard, horns (Tijuana TrainWreck Horns), and backing singers (Shiny Soul Sisters).

Shinyribs' sound is a combination of many styles and influences. Russell calls it "country-soul" and "swamp-funk."  The ultimate decisions on Shinyribs' musical direction are based on Russell's vision for the band.  Live performances generally feature Russell dancing on stage or in a conga line extending through the venue.

“Shinyribs is flamboyant and has completely no rules....  He’s free and is dancing like no one’s watching. He’s all about love and having fun and celebrating life.”

In addition to playing its original music, Shinyribs covers songs like "Waterfalls" (TLC), "Pony" (Ginuwine), "Buy U a Drank" (T-Pain), "All About That Bass" (Meghan Trainor), "Golden Years" (David Bowie), "I Gave Up All I Had and Sorry You're Sick" (Ted Hawkins), "Me and Paul" (Willie Nelson), "Hey Pocky A-Way" (The Meters), "The Wind Cries Mary" (Jimi Hendrix), "Heart of Stone" (The Rolling Stones), "No Diggity" (Blackstreet), and "Baby Don't You Do It" (Marvin Gaye/The Band).

Shinyribs' Kevin Russell produced Cold and Bitter Tears: The Songs of Ted Hawkins with Jenni Finlay and Brian T. Atkinson for Austin-based label Eight 30 Records. The album features Shinyribs ("Who Got My Natural Comb"), James McMurtry ("Big Things"), Kasey Chambers (the title track), and Mary Gauthier ("Sorry You're Sick").

Members 
 Kevin Russell - vocals, guitar, ukulele, mandolin
 Keith Langford - drums, percussion, backing vocals
 Winfield Cheek - keyboards, backing vocals
 Mark Wilson - saxophone, flute
 Daniel "Tiger" Anaya - trumpet
 Alice Spencer - backing vocals
 Kelley Mickwee - backing vocals
 Courtney Santana - backing vocals
 Danny Levin - violin (sometimes member)

Former members 

 Joe Thompson - guitar / vocals
 Sally Allen - backing vocals
 Seth Gibbs - Bass guitar / vocals
 Mike Stewart - Bass, Skwanga 
 Tom Lewis - Drums
 Peter Stafford - Slide guitar
 Jeff Brown - Bass guitar
 Chase DeLong - Drums

Discography

Shinyribs
 Well After Awhile - 2010
 Gulf Coast Museum - 2013
 Okra Candy - 2015
 I Got Your Medicine - 2017
 The Kringle Tingle - 2018
 Goin' Home B/W He Said If I Be Lifted Up (Need To Know) - 2019
 Fog & Bling - 2019
 Late Night TV Gold - 2021

Compilations
 Shinyribs: "Dollar Bill Blues", More Townes Van Zant by the Great Unknown - 2010
 Kevin Russell: "All the Time", While No One Was Looking: Toasting 20 Years of Bloodshot Records - 2014
 Shinyribs: "Bolshevik Sugarcane", Austin Music Vol. 13 - 2014
 Shinyribs: "Song of Lime Juice and Despair", Texas Music Scene: Live, Vol. 1 - 2015
 Shinyribs: "Who Got My Natural Comb", Cold and Bitter Tears: The Songs of Ted Hawkins - 2015

Television 
Shinyribs provided the theme song, "Our Game", for Lone Star Law, a series about game wardens within the Texas Parks and Wildlife Department, which premiered on Animal Planet on June 2, 2016.

Awards

Austin Music Pundits Awards

Lone Star Music Awards

Austin Music Awards

References

External links 
 Shinyribs.org
 Shinyribs at Bandcamp
 Shinyribs at Reverbnation
 Shinyribs Facebook
 Shinyribs Twitter
 Shinyribs recordings on Archive.org

Musical groups from Austin, Texas
Musical groups established in 2007
2007 establishments in Texas